Lucas Filipe da Silva Dias (born January 18, 2003) is a Canadian professional soccer player who  plays as a midfielder for Portuguese club Sporting CP B.

Early life
Born in Toronto, Dias is of Portuguese descent through both sets of grandparents. He began playing house league soccer at age four in Woodbridge. In 2011, he joined the new Sporting Academy Toronto, which was affiliated with Portuguese club Sporting CP, playing two years up. He attracted the attention of the Portuguese club, being invited for brief training stint's with the club's academy when he was nine, later joining the academy permanently at age 11, becoming the first player to move from the Toronto academy to the Portuguese academy. He signed a professional contract with the club at age 16.

Club career
After signing his initial pro contract at age 16, he made his senior debut with Sporting B in a league match against Oriental Dragon in the third tier on May 29, 2021. In June 2021, he extended his contract with Sporting for an additional five years. He split the 2021-22 season between Sporting B in Liga 3 and Sporting U19, where he played in the UEFA Youth League. He scored his first goal for Sporting B on August 22, 2021 in a 1-0 victory against Caldas, earning man of the match honours.

He made his debut for the first team on October 8, 2021 in a friendly against Torreense.

International career
Dias is eligible to represent both Canada and Portugal.

He made his debut for the Portugal U16 team on November 29, 2018 against Denmark U16.

In 2021, Dias was named to the Canada U23 team for the 2020 CONCACAF Men's Olympic Qualifying Championship at age 18. On March 19, 2021, he made his U23 debut against El Salvador U23. He made four appearances, as Canada failed to qualify after being defeated by Mexico U23 in the semi-finals.

In May 2022, Dias was named to the 60-man preliminary squad for the Canada U20 for the 2022 CONCACAF U-20 Championship.

Career statistics

References

External links
 Lucas Dias Sporting profile
 
 

2003 births
Living people
Canadian soccer players
Canada men's under-23 international soccer players
Portugal youth international footballers
Portuguese footballers
Canadian people of Portuguese descent
Association football midfielders
Canadian expatriate soccer players
Canadian expatriate sportspeople in Portugal
Soccer players from Toronto